Ector is a city in Fannin County, Texas, United States. The population was 695 at the 2010 census, up from 600 at the 2000 census.

Geography

Ector is located in western Fannin County at  (33.577470, –96.272284). Texas State Highway 56 runs through the center of town, leading east  to Bonham, the county seat, and west  to Savoy.

Demographics

As of the census of 2000,  600 people, 238 households, and 163 families were residing in the city. The population density was 507.4 people per square mile (196.3/km2). The 263 housing units averaged 222.4/sq mi (86.1/km2). The racial makeup of the city was 95.33% White, 1.17% Native American, 0.50% Asian, 0.33% from other races, and 2.67% from two or more races. Hispanics or Latinos of any race were 1.50% of the population.

Of the 238 households, 35.3% had children under the age of 18 living with them, 55.9% were married couples living together, 10.5% had a female householder with no husband present, and 31.5% were not families. About 29.0% of all households were made up of individuals, and 13.9% had someone living alone who was 65 years of age or older. The average household size was 2.52, and the average family size was 3.13.

In the city, the population was distributed as 30.3% under the age of 18, 4.5% from 18 to 24, 29.0% from 25 to 44, 20.7% from 45 to 64, and 15.5% who were 65 years of age or older. The median age was 35 years. For every 100 females, there were 90.5 males. For every 100 females age 18 and over, there were 86.6 males.

The median income for a household in the city was $38,125, and for a family was $46,500. Males had a median income of $30,781 versus $24,063 for females. The per capita income for the city was $15,083. About 2.9% of families and 5.7% of the population were below the poverty line, including 2.8% of those under age 18 and 10.0% of those age 65 or over.

Education
The city of Ector is served by the Ector Independent School District.

History 
The community started in the late 19th century when farmers settled near Caney Creek. Residents named it "Victor's Station" but, when informed by postal authorities that a town of that name already existed, decided to honor one of the pioneer settlers of the area, Ector Owens.

In 1886, postal service to the community began. The tracks of the Texas and Pacific Railway reached the site in 1892. The railroad quickly made Ector a shipping point for area farmers. In 1904, the town had 218 residents served by a church, a school, and a half dozen businesses, including a bank. The population reached 451 in 1926, when the businesses numbered 25. In 1947, Ector had a reported 457 residents. Subsequently, the population steadily increased, reaching 650 in 1988. The number of businesses continued to decline, however, from 12 in 1936 to three in 1988. By that time, most of the residents were commuting to jobs in Sherman,  to the west, and Denison,  to the northwest.

A $320 million resort and bunker facility called Trident Lakes was under development near Ector in 2017. James O’Connor was CEO with former Navy SEAL Rob Kaneiss as chief security officer. By 2018, the owner of Trident Lakes Property Holdings, John Eckerd, was under investigation for money laundering with investors calling the project a scam.

References

Cities in Texas
Cities in Fannin County, Texas